Nitinkumar Bhikanrao Tale is an Indian politician serving as MLA in Maharashtra Legislative Assembly from Balapur Vidhan Sabha constituency. He is a member of Shiv Sena from Akola district, Maharashtra.

Positions held
 2019: Elected to Maharashtra Legislative Assembly

References

External links
  Shivsena Home Page 

Shiv Sena politicians
Living people
Year of birth missing (living people)
Maharashtra MLAs 2019–2024